Valeriy Smoliy is a Ukrainian academician, historian, director of the NASU Institute of History of Ukraine.

Smoliy was born on 1 January 1950 in a village Avratyn, Volochysk Raion, Kamianets-Podilskyi Oblast.

In 1970 he graduate the historical faculty of the Kamianets-Podilskyi State Pedagogic Institute. After that Smoliy worked as a rural teacher in schools of Ternopil Oblast and a teacher assistant in the Nizhyn Pedagogic Institute.

Since 1972 Smoliy works at the NASU Institute of History of Ukraine. In 1975 he defended his candidate thesis "Union of the right-bank Ukraine with Ukrainian lands within the Russian state" and in 1985 his doctorate thesis "Social consciousness of Ukrainian national movements participants (second half of the 17th-18th centuries)". Since 1986 Smoliy was heading one of departments of the institute. In 1991 he was elected a deputy director of the institute. In 1992 he was admitted to the National Academy of Sciences of Ukraine as a corresponding member.

Since 1993 Smoliy is a director of the NASU Institute of History of Ukraine. In 1995 he became a full member, academician, of the National Academy of Sciences of Ukraine.

In 1997–1999 Smoliy served as a vice-Prime Minister on humanitarian issues in the government of Valeriy Pustovoitenko.

Works
 2011 — Petro Doroshenko. Political portrait. (Петро Дорошенко. Політичній портрет. — К, 2011)
 2004 — My Ukraine (Моя Україна. — К., 2004 та ін.)
 2003 — Ukraine. Progress of history (Україна. Поступ історії. — К., 2003.)
 2002 — Bohdan Khmelnytskyi: A biographic essay (Богдан Хмельницький: Біографічний нарис. — К., 2002.)
 2002 — Ukraine of the 20th century (Україна XX століття: У 2 кн. — К., 2002.)
 1999 — The Ukrainian national revolution of the mid-17th century: problems, searches, decisions (Українська національна революція середини XVII століття: проблеми, пошуки, рішення. — К., 1999.)
 1997 — The idea of Ukrainian statehood in the 17th-18th centuries: problems of formation, evolution, realization (Українська державна ідея XVII–XVIII століть: проблеми формування, еволюції, реалізації. — К., 1997.)
 1994 — History in biographies (Історія в життєписах. — К., 1994.)
 1993 — Bohdan Khmelnytskyi: A social and political portrait (Богдан Хмельницький: соціально-політичний портрет. — К., 1993; 2-е вид., перероб. і доп. — К., 1995.)
 1993 — Right-bank Ukraine in the second half of the 17th-18th centuries: problem of state creation (Правобережна Україна у другій половині XVII–XVIII ст.: проблема державотворення. — К., 1993.)
 1992 — In search of new understanding of the 17th-century liberation war of the Ukrainian people (У пошуках нової концепції Визвольної війни українського народу XVII ст. — К., 1992.)
 1991 — How and when started the Ukrainian nation started to form (Як і коли почала формуватися українська нація. — К., 1991.)
 1986 — Formation of social consciousness of the people masses of Ukraine during the class struggle (second half of the 17th-18th centuries) (Формування соціальної свідомості народних мас України в ході класової боротьби (друга половина XVII–XVIII ст.). — К., 1986.
 1978 — The Union of right-bank Ukraine with Russia (Возз'єднання Правобережної України з Росією. — К., 1978.)

External links
 Valeriy Smoliy at the Vernadsky National Library of Ukraine website.

 

1950 births
Living people
People from Khmelnytskyi Oblast
20th-century Ukrainian historians
Soviet historians
Vice Prime Ministers of Ukraine on humanitarian policy
Kamyanets-Podilsky Ivan Ohienko National University alumni
Academic staff of Nizhyn Gogol State University
NANU Institute of History of Ukraine directors
Members of the National Academy of Sciences of Ukraine
Recipients of the Order of Prince Yaroslav the Wise, 1st class
Recipients of the Order of Prince Yaroslav the Wise, 2nd class
Recipients of the Order of Prince Yaroslav the Wise, 3rd class
Recipients of the Order of Prince Yaroslav the Wise, 4th class
Recipients of the Order of Prince Yaroslav the Wise, 5th class
Recipients of the Order of Merit (Ukraine), 1st class
Recipients of the Order of Merit (Ukraine), 2nd class
Laureates of the State Prize of Ukraine in Science and Technology
Recipients of the Honorary Diploma of the Cabinet of Ministers of Ukraine
21st-century Ukrainian historians